Cistern Field  is a public use airport located near Cistern Cay, the Bahamas.

See also
List of airports in the Bahamas

References

External links 
 Airport record for Cistern Field at Landings.com

Airports in the Bahamas